The Three Musketeers was a 1987 video game for Commodore 64, developed by American Action. The music in the game was made by Lars Hård from Greve Graphics.

See also
 The Three Musketeers, 1844 novel by Alexander Dumas

References

1987 video games
Adventure games
Amiga games
Commodore 64 games
DOS games
Video games based on works by Alexandre Dumas
Video games developed in Sweden
Video games set in France
Video games set in the 17th century